Beskia is a genus of bristle flies in the family Tachinidae. There is at least one described species in Beskia, B. aelops.

References

Dexiinae
Taxa named by Friedrich Moritz Brauer
Taxa named by Julius von Bergenstamm
Diptera of North America
Tachinidae genera